Clews (stylized CLEWS) is an Australian Indie rock band based in Sydney. The band consists of sisters Lily and Grace Richardson and they are currently signed with Wonderlick Entertainment. The duo have their own podcast called "Love Clews" which they started in 2021.  Their song ‘Museum’ received full rotation on triple j and they have supported Portugal. The Man, Ocean Alley, Middle Kids, and Albert Hammond Jr.

History 
Sisters Lily and Grace Richardson were raised in the coastal Australian town of Mollymook. Lily, the elder sister, began writing songs at age 15.  The sisters were introduced to music at an early age; their father and his brother formed a band called Brother, which toured throughout the United States in the 1990s and 2000s. During this time, the sisters followed their father on tour, living in the United States for several years. The band released their first single, Museum, on February 23, 2018. They have since released many additional singles.

The sisters cite Oasis, Crowded House, The Beatles, The Strokes and Jeff Buckley as influences, among others. The band has been praised for their vocal harmonies and lyricism, with Tone Deaf describing their songs as "beautifully crafted poems, where the listener becomes adrift on a river of pure magic." Triple J asserts that CLEWS' songs will "make your heart explode.

Discography

Eps
Loveluck Omens (2021)

Singles
Museum (2018)
Crushed (2018)
Crushed II (2019)
Hollywood (2019)
New Age (2019)
Feel (2020)
Want You That Way (2021)
Overluck (2021)
The Aftergone- Holy Holy (2021)

References

Living people
Year of birth missing (living people)
Australian musical duos
21st-century Australian singers
21st-century Australian women singers
Female musical duos